Natalie Louise Blair (born 16 April 1984) is an Australian actress, best known for her role as Carmella Cammeniti on the Australian television series Neighbours.

Personal life

Blair was born to John Blair on 16 April 1984 and raised in Gold Coast, Queensland, Australia.

Career

Back in early 2003, Blair auditioned for Neighbours and impressed casting director Jan Russ, but she was not cast. Russ contacted Blair six months later and asked her to audition for the role of Carmella Cammeniti. She was cast on the spot as producers needed to fill the gap left by Delta Goodrem's sudden departure. Blair started filming just after she graduated from school.

In 2005, Blair won "Most Popular New Female Talent" at the 47th Annual Logie Awards. Blair was also nominated in 2007 for both the Gold and Silver Logie, for "Most Popular Personality on Australian Television". She was again nominated for both awards in 2008. Blair was crowned "Queen of Teen" at the Dolly Teen Choice Awards at Sydney's Luna Park in 2007.

In December 2007, Blair starred in the Spillers Ltd Production of Snow White and the Seven Dwarfs as Snow White at the Music Hall in Shrewsbury. Blair also sang solo and a cappella the first verse of "Once in Royal David's City" at the annual BBC Shropshire Carols in the Square event in Shrewsbury on 19 December 2007.

Blair left Neighbours after five years in 2009. She then moved to Los Angeles, but returned home later that year to play chief villain Connie Burns in the feature film Stage Fright. Upon completion of the film, also starring Clare Bowen and Jason Smith, Natalie left Queensland and returned to Los Angeles.

Blair returned to Neighbours in March 2011 for two episodes. Also in March 2011, Natalie began shooting the feature film The Sleeping Warrior, portraying the character of Safia. The film was set for release in 2012. A story that connects Hindu spirituality and Australian aboriginal spirituality.

In 2012, Blair returned to Melbourne, Australia to play the lead in the romantic comedy The Groomless Bride. The film also stars underworld figure Chopper Reid.

actor Beau Brady. The pair met on the set of Voodoo Lagoon in 2006 and quietly separated in January 2007, with their split being confirmed by a Neighbours spokeswoman. The pair reportedly split due to Brady's decision to move to Los Angeles to pursue his career.

Blair began a relationship with her Neighbours co-star David Hoflin in 2008. The pair currently live together in Los Angeles. On 10 March 2012, Fiona Byrne of the Herald Sun reported the couple were engaged. They were married on 4 January 2013 in Warburton, Victoria. Blair and Hoflin welcomed their first child, a son, on 29 July 2016.

Filmography

References

External links 

1984 births
Actresses from Brisbane
Australian soap opera actresses
Living people
Logie Award winners
People educated at Lourdes Hill College